Don Cartagena is the third studio album by American rapper Fat Joe. The album was released on September 1, 1998, by Atlantic Records, Craig Kallman's Big Beat Records, Mystic Entertainment Group and Fat Joe's Terror Squad Productions.

The album received generally positive reviews. The album debuted at number seven on the US Billboard 200 chart. The album was certified Gold by the Recording Industry Association of America (RIAA) for shipping and selling over 500,000 copies in America.

Critical reception
The album received generally positive reviews. Soren Baker from the Los Angeles Times, gave the album a positive review, calling it "Joe's triumphant return project". Baker also talked about how "Joe largely sticks to ultra-violent lyrics and gangster story lines." and that "The album's appeal rests largely on his ability to effortless sly mix gangsterism and braggadocio." Overall the album was giving a 3.5 out of 4 rating by the critic. Matt Diehl from Entertainment Weekly also praised the album, stating that despite his strong level of featured appearances; "Fat Joe doesn't need any help: His blunt lyrical flow, infectious Latino pride, and appropriately ominous grooves make these gangsta tales explode like a sonic Scarface". The album was ultimately given a rating of A− by Diehl.

Commercial performance
Don Cartagena debuted at number seven on the US Billboard 200 chart, selling 106,000 copies in its first week. This became Joe's first US top-ten debut. In its second week, the album dropped to number 15 on the chart. On October 28, 1998, the album was certified gold by the Recording Industry Association of America (RIAA) for sales of over 500,000 copies in the United States.

Track listing
Credits adapted from the album's liner notes.

Sample credits
 "The Crack Attack" contains samples from "Slow Dance" performed by Stanley Clarke, "Have Mercy on Me" performed by The East St. Louis Gospelettes and "Shook Ones (Part II)" performed by Mobb Deep.
 "My World" contains a sample from "Don't You Know That?", written and performed by Luther Vandross.
 "John Blaze" contains samples from "Dirty Ole Man" performed by Mandrill “Clock Strikes (Remix)” performed by Timbaland & Magoo  and "How High (Remix)" performed by Method Man & Redman.
 "Bet Ya Man Can't (Triz)" contains a sample from "Got to Be Real", written by Cheryl Lynn, David Paich, and David Foster, as performed by Cheryl Lynn.  It also contains an interpolation of "No Time", written by Kimberly Jones, Sean Combs, and Steven Jordan.

Charts

Weekly charts

Year-end charts

Certifications

References

1998 albums
Fat Joe albums
Atlantic Records albums
Albums produced by DJ Premier
Albums produced by Marley Marl
Albums produced by Buckwild
Albums produced by L.E.S. (record producer)
Albums produced by Ski Beatz
Albums produced by Dame Grease